Charles Barker was a Republican member of the Wisconsin State Assembly during the 1901 through 1903 sessions. A native of Milwaukee, Wisconsin, Barker represented the 12th District of Milwaukee County, Wisconsin.

References

External links
The Political Graveyard

Politicians from Milwaukee
Republican Party members of the Wisconsin State Assembly
Year of birth missing
Year of death missing